Raven: A Journal of Vexillology is a peer-reviewed academic journal covering the scholarly examination of flags (vexillology), including the social, historical, and political significance of flags of all kinds. The journal is named for the Raven banner of the Vikings. It is abstracted and indexed in America: History and Life and Historical Abstracts. Raven is published by the North American Vexillological Association.

Four vexillologists have served as the journal's editor:• Scot M. Guenter (1994–95)• Edward B. (Ted) Kaye (1996–2013)• Kenneth W. Reynolds (2014–17)• Scott D. Mainwaring (2018–)

Special issues 
Raven occasionally publishes special issues dedicated to particular flags.

 Vol. 25 – Vatican Flags
 Vol. 18 – Canadian City Flags
 Vol. 16 – Russian Regional Flags
 Vol. 9/10 – American City Flags
 Vol. 5 – The United States Flag
 Vol. 3/4 – Flags of the Native Peoples of the United States

See also 
 Whitney Smith

References

External links 
 

Annual journals
English-language journals
Publications established in 1994
Literature on heraldry
Semiotics journals
Literature on vexillology
Academic journals published by learned and professional societies